D-Lightsys, a Radiall Company, designs and manufactures high performance optical interconnect products for severe environment applications.   D-Lightsys products are based on optoelectronic components.  The company headquarters are located in Aubervilliers, near Paris, France.  Products are manufactured in Isle d’Abeau, near Lyon, and are sold through the Radiall sales network under the D-Lightsys brand.

History
In 2002, D-Lightsys won the French award for the most innovative high-tech start-up. It was founded that year by Mathias Pez and François Quentel, two fiber optic interconnection specialists who previously worked for the Thales Group Advanced Research Center.

On April 15, 2005, Radiall announced its acquisition of a 40% stake in D-Lightsys. On January 8, 2008, Radiall announced an increase in its shareholdings of the start-up D-Lightsys to 95 percent.

Research
Many products use vertical-cavity surface-emitting laser (VCSEL) technology.

Point to point VCSEL-based free space optical data link 
D-Lightsys considers free space optical links for intermediate communication distances ranging from a few centimeters to one or two meters. In a 2006 paper, they presented the initial simulations and the first experimental characterizations of a VCSEL-based point-to-point free space interconnect on distances ranging from 16 cm to 40 cm targeting bit rates up to 10 Gbit/s.

High-throughput optical interconnect technology
Alcatel Space and the CNES have investigated  optical interconnects as an enabling technology that may offer the high-throughput data communication capabilities required to the future on-board processors and digital equipment.  D-Lightsys cooperated on this research with the development of the optoelectronic modules.

Spatiotemporal and thermal analysis of VCSEL
High-speed optoelectronic modules using VCSEL] coupled to multi-mode optical fibers are used for 10 Gigabit Ethernet in short-distance optical links. A complete model of the spatiotemporal behavior of multimode VCSELs, through static and dynamic response, noise, thermal effects, and its coupling to MMF has been investigated. The two founders of D-Lightsys took part in this study.

Relative intensity noise shows modal dependence and can be affected by spatial filtering due to coupling and fiber propagation. Simulations permit to evaluate critical parameters, such as modulation formats, launching conditions, and operating temperature for global bandwidth and eye diagram optimization up to 10 Gbit/s. Simulation results are compared to measurements on prototype optoelectronic modules.

VHDL-AMS model 
In a 2004 study, in which Matthias Pez of D-Lightsys contributed, is presented a methodology based on VHDL-AMS modeling for taking into account the thermal effects of an optical emission module combined with electronic and optic behavior. The thermal transfer is due to the self-heating on one side and the interaction between the components of the other side. This methodology is implemented and simulated with ADVanceMS.

References

External links
 D-Lightsys web site
 Reuters Press Release: GigOptix and D-Lightsys Optical Interconnects to be Used on Airbus Military A400M

Fiber-optic connectors
Electronics companies of France